Gulgam is a village in Kupwara district, and the Indian union territory of Jammu and Kashmir. There are 119 scheduled tribes persons of which 55 are females and 64 are males. Females constitute 46.22% and males constitute 53.78% of the scheduled tribes population. Scheduled tribes constitute 1.23% of the total population.

Population density of Gulgam is 1754.71 persons per square kilometer.

Demographics 
As of the 2011 Census of India, Gulgam village has a total population of 9,679 people including 4,944 males and 4,735 females. The literacy rate of the village is 49.40%.

References 

Cities and towns in Kupwara district
Kupwara district
Villages in Kupwara district